Vikram K. Kumar is an Indian film director and screenwriter who works in Telugu and Tamil cinema. In 1998, he directed his breakthrough non-feature film, Silent Scream, for which he won the National Film Award For Best Instructional Film. He made his directorial debut in Telugu cinema  industry with Ishtam in 2001, and then directed the Tamil movie, 
Yavarum Nalam  (13B in Hindi).

In 2014, he scripted and directed Manam which was screened at the 45th International Film Festival of India in the Homage to Akkineni Nageswara Rao section on 29 November 2014. The film garnered the Filmfare Award for Best Film - Telugu. He then directed the box-office hits such as the science-fiction 24 (2016), which won two awards at the 64th National Film Awards, and the comedy-thriller Gang Leader  (2019).

Early career
Kumar graduated from Madras Christian College in Chennai. In April 1997 he joined director Priyadarshan, working on the Malayalam film Chandralekha as assistant director. He also worked under Priyadarshan in Doli Saja Ke Rakhna and Hera Pheri.

Filmography

Films

Web series

Awards
National Film Awards
National Film Award for Best Educational/Motivational/Instructional Film (director) Silent Scream (1998)

Filmfare Awards South
Filmfare Award for Best Director - Telugu -  Manam (2014)
Santosham Film Awards

 Santosham Best Film Award -  Manam (2014)

References

External links
 
 

Tamil film directors
Telugu film directors
Filmfare Awards South winners
Living people
20th-century Indian film directors
Film directors from Chennai
Screenwriters from Chennai
21st-century Indian film directors
Year of birth missing (living people)
Santosham Film Awards winners